The 1966 BYU Cougars football team was an American football team that represented Brigham Young University (BYU) as a member of the Western Athletic Conference (WAC) during the 1966 NCAA University Division football season. In their third season under head coach Tommy Hudspeth, the Cougars compiled an overall record of 8–2 with a mark of 3–2 against conference opponents, tied for second place in the WAC, and outscored opponents by a total of 269 to 163.

Quarterback Virgil Carter led the country with 2,545 yards of total offense; he also led the team with 2,182 passing yards and 56 points scored. On November 5, 1966, he set new NCAA single-game records with 513 passing yards and 599 yards of total offense against Texas Western. Carter's totals of 513 passing yards and 599 yards of total offense stood as BYU school records until broken by Ty Detmer in 1991.

The team's other statistical leaders included John Ogden with 906 rushing yards and Phil Odle with 920 receiving yards.

Six BYU players were selected to the all-conference team: wide receiver Phil Odle; guard Grant Wilson; quarterback Virgil Carter; fullback John Ogden; linebacker Curg Belcher; and safety Bobby Roberts.

Schedule

Personnel

Season summary

at Utah

References

BYU
BYU Cougars football seasons
BYU Cougars football